This is a list of American foods and dishes. There are a few foods that predate colonization,  and the European colonization of the Americas brought about the introduction of many new ingredients and cooking styles. This variety continued expanding well into the 19th and 20th proportional to the influx migrants from additional foreign nations. There is a rich diversity in food preparation throughout the United States.

This list is not exhaustive, nor does it cover every item consumed in the U.S., but it does include foods and dishes that are common in the U.S. (highly available and regularly consumed), or which originated there.  The list is representative only.  For more foods in a given category, see the main article for that category.

American foods

Breads

 Banana bread
 Cornbread
 Cuban bread
 Frybread
 Texas toast

Cheese

 American cheese (technically a processed cheese)
 Cheddar cheese
 Colby (as well as the blend Colby-Jack)
 Cream cheese
 Monterey Jack (and used in pepper jack cheese)
 Velveeta (brand name of a common processed cheese)

Desserts

Banana pudding
Chocolate brownie
Chocolate chip cookies
Fudge
Jell-O
Key lime pie
Peanut butter cookie
Pecan pie
Pumpkin pie
Red velvet cake
S'more
Sundae
Ice cream

Rice dishes

 Calas
 Charleston red rice
 Chicken bog
 Dirty rice
 Glorified rice
 Gumbo
 Hawaiian haystack
 Hoppin' John
 Jambalaya
 Rice and gravy
 Red beans and rice
 Shrimp creole
 Spanish rice

Sandwiches

 BLT
 Cheesesteak
 Club sandwich
 Fluffernutter
 Italian beef
 Pastrami on rye
 Peanut butter and jelly sandwich
 Reuben sandwich
 Sloppy joe

Sausages

 Bologna sausage
 Breakfast sausage
 Chaudin
 Goetta
 Half-smoke
 Hot link (sausage)
 Italian hot dog
 Lebanon bologna
 Maxwell Street Polish
 Polish Boy
 Chorizo

Miscellaneous 

 Buffalo Wings
 Roasted turkey
 Fried Chicken

Gallery 

Detroit style coney dog

General items

This includes general areas of food interest relating to the United States.
  Barbecue in the United States
  Barbecue in North Carolina
  Barbecue in Texas
  Kansas City-style barbecue
  Memphis-style barbecue
  Santa Maria-style barbecue
  Pizza in the United States
 California-style pizza
 Chicago-style pizza
 New York-style pizza
 Detroit-style pizza
  History of the hamburger in the United States
  New American cuisine
  Roadkill cuisine
  Native American cuisine
  Tex-Mex
  Thanksgiving dinner

See also

 Indigenous cuisine of the Americas
 Canadian cuisine
 Mexican cuisine
 List of American breakfast foods
 List of American sandwiches
 List of American regional and fusion cuisines
 List of foods
 List of foods of the Southern United States
 List of regional dishes of the United States
 List of soul foods and dishes

References

External links
 

American Foods

Delicious cooking recipe in America